Eunice Verdell Rivers Laurie (1899 – 1986) was an African American nurse who worked in the state of Alabama. She is mostly known for her work as one of the nurses of the U.S. Public Health Service Syphilis Study in Macon County from 1932 to 1972. The Tuskegee Experiment, as it is sometimes referred to, was an inhumane study that deliberately allowed black men to develop syphilis when there was treatment for the disease.

Early life and education
Born into a farming family in rural Georgia in 1899, Eunice Verdell Rivers was the oldest of three daughters. Originating from a poor, working-class family, Rivers' education allowed her access to middle-class life. Her mother, who died when Rivers was 15 years old, encouraged her to attend school from a young age. Her father, also a proponent of education, encouraged her to become a nurse. He wanted all three of his daughters to have adequate schooling, working long hours at the sawmill to help finance their studies.

In 1918, Rivers' father sent her to study at the Tuskegee Institute. For the first year she took classes in "handicrafts". Following her father's advice, Eunice inquired and enrolled in the Institutes' School of Nursing and graduated in 1922. After graduating from the, Rivers worked in the public health sector from 1923 until well after her retirement in 1965.

Career
Beginning in January 1923, Rivers worked for the Tuskegee Institute Movable School. As part of the school, she provided various public health services to African-American men and women in rural Alabama and became a trusted health authority for African-American farming families in the area around Tuskegee, Alabama. She supplied adult education programs in agriculture, home economics, and health. 

In her work with the Movable School, Rivers was an employee of the Alabama Bureau of Child Welfare. Beginning in 1926, the state transferred her to the Bureau of Vital Statistics, where her projects included improving birth and death registration, regulating and training midwives, and reducing infant mortality.  She was instrumental in creating a system that tracked the number of births and deaths in the state of Alabama. She also helped to regulate midwifery and lower infant mortality rates. She continued to work with the Movable School, traveling around Alabama but this time focusing on pregnant women and midwives. In her first year, she visited over 20 counties and was noted for tending to 1,100 people during a particularly busy month.

Impact on race relations
Rivers became one of the first African-Americans to be employed by the United States Public Health System (PHS), thus paving the way for other people of color in this area of service. 

She was the third  recipient of the Oveta Culp Hobby Award, the highest award the Department of Health, Education, and Welfare could grant an employee.

Tuskegee syphilis study
Beginning in 1932, Rivers worked for the United States Public Health Service on The Study of Untreated Syphilis in the Negro Male in Macon County, Alabama, popularly known as the Tuskegee syphilis experiment.  She recruited 600 African-American men with syphilis for the study and worked to keep them enrolled as participants in the program. In return for their participation, the study offered participants free medical care, which Rivers provided. Rivers was the experiment's only consistent full-time staff member.

Although the study was initially planned to run only six months, it eventually extended to 40 years. During the entire study, the participants were not informed that the ailment they called "bad blood" was actually syphilis. When the study started, arsphenamine (Salvarsan) and Neosalvarsan were the only available treatments for syphilis, and both compounds had dangerous side effects. However, even after the 1940s when the discovery of penicillin offered a reliable and safe cure for the disease, study participants did not receive treatment. After the New York Times and Washington Post revealed that study participants had been allowed to suffer rather than receiving a known safe treatment, the Public Health Service ended it in 1972.

Historians have offered a variety of interpretations for why Rivers continued her role in a project that, by modern standards of medical ethics, was completely unethical.

Public perception 

Once the news of the unethical treatment of participants in the Tuskegee Study was exposed in 1972, Rivers retreated into silence. Some see her primarily as a dedicated nurse, willing to follow any orders to keep treating her patients. Others see her as a race traitor who used her education and class power to keep her job and sell out the rural men she was caring for. There is evidence for both narratives. Just as she was crucial in recruiting and keeping participants in the study, she also provided them with both medical and mental care they otherwise would not have received. She listened to their complaints, suggested ways to gain assistance outside of the hospital, offered them comfort, and provided simple medication, such as vitamins. She helped establish the Miss Rivers Lodge, which provided the men's families financial assistance for burials in exchange for the men's participation in the study. Her actions provided the men with more treatment opportunities for other conditions than they had received from health professionals. This article neglects to realize that none of those vitamins mattered because they did not treat the syphilis. And financial assistance for burials means nothing when you're the reason the men are dead in the first place. She did not give these men penicillin, she gave them placebos.

Later life and death
In 1977, Rivers was interviewed for the Black Women Oral History Project.

She died in 1986.

References

Additional resources
 
 

1899 births
1986 deaths
American nurses
American women nurses
African-American nurses
African-American history of Alabama
Tuskegee Institute alumni
20th-century African-American women
20th-century African-American people
20th-century American people